Zeher-e-Ishq is a Pakistani Sufism love Drama film directed by Khalid Khan and written by Mohammad Asif. The film stars are Rohit Purohit (India), Aslihan Akmez (Turkey), Asad Zaman Khan, Resham, Sana Nawaz, Tipu, Shabbir Jan, Shakeel, Suzain Fatima and Shazad Ali Khan.

Plot
A whirling Dervish from Turkey falls in love with a Jogi in Pakistan. Their romantic attraction scandalizes their communities, with attempts made to divide the couple. The couple's love for each other is stronger than their community's animosity so they abandon all, and flee. Their love is put to the test by enduring the hardships of crossing a scorching desert but emerge to a dramatic end.

Cast 
 Asad Zaman Khan 
 Maira Khan 
 Rohit Purohit
 Aslihan Akmez from Turkey
 Resham
 Sana Nawaz
 Tipu
 Shabbir Jan
 Shakil
 Suzain Fatima
 Atiya Khan
 Shazad Ali khan

Production 
Principal photography on the film began in mid-December 2015, which will end in 2017. Filming took place on several locations in Pakistan, Turkey and Europe.

Soundtrack

The soundtrack for Zeher-e-Ishq is composed by Waqar Ali, comprising  seven songs, sung by Sajjad Ali and Rahat Fateh Ali Khan and Indian playback singers Sunidhi Chauhan, Palak Muchhal and Mohammad Irfan Ali.

References

External links

Unreleased Pakistani films
Pakistani musical films
Pakistani romance films
Films shot in Turkey
Films shot in Karachi